Vietnam national football team results, including the results of former French Cochinchina, State of Vietnam, South Vietnam and North Vietnam.

Results

Keynotes

 * Vietnam's score always listed first
 (H) Home country stadium
 (A) Away country stadium
 (N) Neutral venue stadium
 1 Non FIFA 'A' international match

2010–2019

2019

2018

2017

2016

2015

2014

2013

2012

2011

2010

2000–2009 results

2009

2008

2007

2006

2004

2003

2002

2001

2000

1990–1999 results

1999

1998

1997

1996

1995

1993

1991

1956–1970 North Vietnam results

1970

1966

1965

1963

1960

1959

1956

1956–1975 South Vietnam results

1975

1974

1973

1972

1971

1970

1969

1968

1967

1966

1965

1964

1963

1962

1961

1960

1959

1958

1957

1956

1954 State of Vietnam results

1954

1947–1949 French Cochinchina results

1949

1948

1947

Notes

References

External links
 Vietnam Fixtures and Results on FIFA.com
 Vietnam Football Federation

1947
1940s in Vietnam
1950s in Vietnam
1960s in Vietnam
1970s in Vietnam
1980s in Vietnamese sport
1990s in Vietnamese sport
2000s in Vietnamese sport
2010s in Vietnamese sport